The Mesilla Valley is a geographic feature of Southern New Mexico and far West Texas. It was formed by repeated heavy spring floods of the Rio Grande.

Background 
The fertile Mesilla Valley extends from Radium Springs, New Mexico, to the west side of El Paso, Texas. The valley is characterized by its few remaining bosques, as well as its native cottonwood trees, and increasingly, by invasive tamarisk, which was introduced in the late 19th century, and is known locally as salt cedar.

Due to the fertile nature of the valley, agriculture is a very important activity in this area. Stahmann Farms owns the world's largest pecan orchard, located south of the city of Las Cruces, New Mexico. Alfalfa, cotton, chile, onions and corn are other important cash crops grown in the Mesilla Valley. The Mesilla Valley is also known for its wine-producing capabilities, which originated with the Spanish exploration into New Mexico. It was part of Mexico until Gadsden Purchase in 1853.

Further reading
Leggat, E.R., M.E. Lowry, and J.W. Hood. (1963). Ground-water resources of the lower Mesilla Valley, Texas and New Mexico [U.S. Geological Survey Water-Supply Paper 1669-AA]. Washington, D.C.: U.S. Government Printing Office.

References

Valleys of New Mexico
Valleys of Texas
Regions of New Mexico
Regions of Texas
Landforms of Doña Ana County, New Mexico